The Lebanese-Palestinian Dialogue Committee (LPDC), originally called the Lebanese Working Group on Palestinian Refugees, is an inter-ministerial government body formed in November 2005 by Lebanese Council of Ministers’ decision 89/2005. Its mission is to implement the policies of the Lebanese government towards Palestinian refugees in Lebanon.

LPDC plays an important consultative role to the government, bringing expertise from various areas, in coordinating policies across ministries and making recommendations at the policy level.  It also coordinates work with UNRWA through PLO, Lebanese and Palestinian counterparts and civil society to achieve its mission.

LPDC Committee 
The committee of LPDC consists of representatives from several Lebanese ministries presided over by President of LPDC, Dr. Khaldoun El-Charif. The Senior Advisor to the Prime Minister, Ambassador Mohammed Chatah, is also a member of the committee. Moreover, efforts are currently underway to add a representative from the Ministry of Education to the committee. Specifically, the LPDC committee's broad mandate, as per the decree, includes:
 The outstanding socio-economic, legal and security issues related to the Palestinian refugees residing in Lebanon, in collaboration with UNRWA
 Developing a policy to address the issue of Palestinian arms outside the camps
 Study the creation of a mechanism that regulates the use of arms inside the Palestinian camps
 Examine the possibility of creating formal relations through re-establishing the PLO representation in Lebanon
The committee meets regularly to discuss the issues outlined in their mandate. Recommendations for administrative and legal reforms and amendments to long-standing procedures and policies are made with the aim of improving the conditions and rights granted to Palestinian refugees living in Lebanon.

The Mandate 

Alongside the committee, the LPDC team pursues a distinct mandate. This includes, but is not limited to, the following activities:ref name="ows"/>

 Provide technical support and assistance in the application of government policy and in all efforts and events relating to Palestinian refugees in Lebanon
 Coordination between the various ministries in the application of government policy
 Coordination with UNRWA on a range of issues including some urgent infrastructure projects included in UNRWA's Medium Term plan and Nahr el-Bared crisis affairs
 Dialogue with the various Palestinian groups and civil society
 Coordination with the international and Arab donor countries to raise funds for implementing the new policy
 Raise awareness among both Lebanese and Palestinians, and promote dialogue and understanding
 Maintain contact with Lebanese political parties, religious leaders and civil society to promote government policy
 Participate in relief operations and coordinate the movement of the recovery and reconstruction process of NBC camps
 Liaise with local and international NGOs

With these mandates and the previous events of the past two years, LPDC has played a dynamic and emerging role in all aspects of Palestinian refugee affairs.  It is integral in supporting the Government as it turns over a new leaf, actively working to enhance the situation for the benefit of Lebanese and Palestinians alike.

References

Palestinians in Lebanon
Organizations established in 2005
Lebanese governmental organisations